Elijah Edward Pinnance (1879–1944), nicknamed "Peanuts", was a Canadian Major League Baseball pitcher. He played for the Philadelphia Athletics during the  season.

Pinnance was the first full-blooded American Indian to play in a regular season game in the majors, which occurred on September 14, 1903. At that time, Pinnance pitched for the Philadelphia Athletics at Washington against the Senators.

He went to Michigan State University.

References

External links

1879 births
1944 deaths
Albany Senators players
Amsterdam-Gloversville-Johnstown Hyphens players
Amsterdam-Gloversville-Johnstown Jags players
Bay City (minor league baseball) players
Canadian expatriate baseball players in the United States
Major League Baseball pitchers
Philadelphia Athletics players
Major League Baseball players from Canada
First Nations sportspeople
Troy Trojans (minor league) players
Portland Beavers players
Portland Colts players
Davenport Prodigals players